Stadium "Dr. Milan Jelić" is a multi-purpose stadium in Modriča, Republika Srpska, Bosnia and Herzegovina. It is currently used mostly for football matches and is the home ground of FK Alfa Modriča.  The stadium has a capacity that can hold 6,000 spectators.

Other notable events
One of the first concerts held on the stadium was: 
Svetlana "Ceca" Ražnatović performed a concert as part of her Poziv Tour promoting her album Poziv on 2 August 2014.

References

External links
Stadion Dr. Milan Jelić information at soccerwiki.org

m
Multi-purpose stadiums in Bosnia and Herzegovina
Buildings and structures in Republika Srpska
stadium